Events in the year 1185 in Norway.

Incumbents
Monarch: Sverre Sigurdsson

Events
 Autumn - The  (Kuvlungene) rises up in revolt in Viken. Their leader, Jon Kuvlung, was a former monk and was claimed to be the son of Inge Krokrygg.

Arts and literature

Births
Inge II of Norway, king (died 1217).

Deaths

References

Norway